German submarine U-677 was a Type VIIC U-boat of Nazi Germany's Kriegsmarine during World War II. The submarine was laid down on 13 June 1942 at the Howaldtswerke yard at Hamburg, launched on 6 July 1943, and commissioned on 20 September 1943 under the command of Oberleutnant zur See Paul Weber.

Attached to 5th U-boat Flotilla based at Kiel, U-677 completed her training period on 31 May 1944 and was assigned to front-line service.

Design
German Type VIIC submarines were preceded by the shorter Type VIIB submarines. U-677 had a displacement of  when at the surface and  while submerged. She had two shafts and two  propellers.

U-677 was fitted with five  torpedo tubes (four fitted at the bow and one at the stern), fourteen torpedoes, one  SK C/35 naval gun, (220 rounds), one  Flak M42 and two twin  C/30 anti-aircraft guns. The boat had a complement of between forty-four and sixty.

Service history

During a British air raid on Hamburg on 5 April 1945, U-677 was damaged while in the Howaldtswerke yard. In a second air raid four days later, U-677 as well as another U-boat, sank in the U-boat pen Fink II.

References

Bibliography

External links

German Type VIIC submarines
1943 ships
Ships built in Hamburg
U-boats commissioned in 1943
U-boats sunk in 1945
U-boats sunk by British aircraft
Maritime incidents in April 1945
World War II submarines of Germany